Diaphragm may refer to:

Anatomy
 Thoracic diaphragm, a thin sheet of muscle between the thorax and the abdomen
 Pelvic diaphragm or pelvic floor, a pelvic structure
 Urogenital diaphragm or triangular ligament, a pelvic structure

Other
 Diaphragm (optics), a stop in the light path of a lens, having an aperture that regulates the amount of light that passes
 Diaphragm (acoustics), a thin, semi-rigid membrane that vibrates to produce or transmit sound waves
 Diaphragm (birth control), a small rubber dome placed in the vagina to wall off the cervix, thus preventing sperm from entering
 Diaphragm (mechanical device), a sheet of a semi-flexible material anchored at its periphery
 Diaphragm (structural system), a structural engineering system used to resist lateral loads

See also
 Diaphragm arch
 Diaphragm pump
 Diaphragm seal, a membrane that seals an enclosure
 Diaphragm shutter,  a type of leaf shutter consisting of a number of thin blades in a camera
 Diaphragm valve
 Diaphragm wall
 Diaphragma, a genus of algae
 Lamina (disambiguation)
 Membrane (disambiguation)